Audrey Rennard (14 January 1933 - 19 January 2020), later known as Audrey Beever, was a British gymnast. She competed in the women's artistic team all-around at the 1948 Summer Olympics.

References

External links
 

1933 births
2020 deaths
British female artistic gymnasts
Olympic gymnasts of Great Britain
Gymnasts at the 1948 Summer Olympics
Place of birth missing